Klondyke is an unincorporated community in southern Reserve Township, Parke County, in the U.S. state of Indiana.

History
Klondyke was founded in 1907, and probably was so named in commemoration of the Klondike Gold Rush.

Geography

References

Unincorporated communities in Indiana
Unincorporated communities in Parke County, Indiana